"(Turn Out the Light And) Love Me Tonight" is a song written by Bob McDill, and recorded by American country music artist Don Williams.  It was released in August 1975 as the second single from the album You're My Best Friend.  The song was Williams' ninth country hit and his third number one on the country chart.  The single went to number one for one week and spent a total of twelve weeks on the country chart.

Chart performance

Cover versions
 The song was covered by Ray Charles on his 1979 album Ain't It So.
 The song was covered by Kenny Chesney on his 1996 album Me and You.

References

1975 singles
1975 songs
Don Williams songs
Ray Charles songs
Kenny Chesney songs
Songs written by Bob McDill
Song recordings produced by Allen Reynolds
ABC Records singles
Dot Records singles